Dudley Cassidy (15 October 1912 – 2 July 2003) was an Australian rules footballer who played with North Melbourne in the Victorian Football League (VFL).

Cassidy was originally listed at Collingwood but after getting a clearance joined North Melbourne and made his league debut in 1935. He was North Melbourne's leading goal-kicker in 1936 when he kicked 48 goals.

References

External links

1912 births
Australian rules footballers from Victoria (Australia)
North Melbourne Football Club players
2003 deaths